The 8th Field Artillery Regiment "Pasubio" is a field artillery regiment of the Italian Army, specializing in armored combat. As of 2022 the regiment is based together with the 52nd Artillery Regiment "Torino" in Persano in Campania. The Pasubio is operationally assigned to the Bersaglieri Brigade "Garibaldi".

History 
For its conduct and work after the 1976 Friuli earthquake the 8th Self-propelled Field Artillery Group "Pasubio" was awarded a Bronze Medal of Army Valour, which was affixed to the group's war flag and added to the group's coat of arms.

Current Structure
As of 2019 the 8th Field Artillery Regiment "Pasubio" consists of:

  Regimental Command, in Persano
 Command and Logistic Support Battery
 Surveillance, Target Acquisition and Tactical Liaison Battery
 1st Self-propelled Group
 1st Howitzer Battery
 2nd Howitzer Battery
 3rd Howitzer Battery
 Fire and Technical Support Battery 

The Command and Logistic Support Battery fields the following sections: C3 Section, Transport and Materiel Section, Medical Section, and Commissariat Section. The regiment is equipped with PzH 2000 self-propelled howitzers. The Surveillance, Target Acquisition and Tactical Liaison Battery is equipped with RQ-11B Raven unmanned aerial vehicles and ARTHUR counter-battery radars.

See also 
 Bersaglieri Brigade "Garibaldi"

External links
Italian Army Website: 8° Reggimento Artiglieria Terrestre "Pasubio"

References

Artillery Regiments of Italy